Mixed-mode may refer to:
 Blended mode, a charge-depleting mode of operation for plug-in hybrid electric vehicles
 Mixed Mode CD, a Compact Disc in which two different data types are combined
 Mixed-mode commuting, passenger transport involving two or more modes of transportation in a journey
 Mixed-mode chromatography, utilizing more than one form of interaction between the stationary phase and analytes
 Mixed-mode integrated circuit, any integrated circuit that has both analog circuits and digital circuits
 Mixed-mode ventilation, which uses a combination of operable windows and mechanical systems